Dene Cottages consists of a pair of cottages in the village of Great Budworth, Cheshire, England.  The cottages are designated by English Heritage as a Grade II listed building.

The cottages were built in 1867–68 for Rowland Egerton-Warburton of Arley Hall and designed by the Chester architect John Douglas.  The lower storeys are constructed in brown brick and the upper storeys are timber-framed with plaster panels.  The roof is in clay tiles. The plaster panels are pargetted with floral motifs.

See also
Listed buildings in Great Budworth
List of houses and associated buildings by John Douglas

References

Grade II listed buildings in Cheshire
Houses completed in 1868
Houses in Cheshire
John Douglas buildings
Timber framed buildings in Cheshire